Timothy R. Young (born October 15, 1973) is a former American professional baseball pitcher. He played professionally for the Montreal Expos and the Boston Red Sox of Major League Baseball (MLB), and was a member of the United States national baseball team that won a gold medal in the 2000 Summer Olympics in Sydney.

Early life
Born in Gulfport, Mississippi, Young attended Liberty County High School in Bristol, Florida. He played college baseball at the University of Alabama.

Professional career
On June 4, 1996, at 5'9" and 170 pounds, Young was drafted by the Montreal Expos in the 19th round of the 1996 Major League Baseball Draft. He played one season for the Expos in 1998, and was granted free agency on December 18, 1998.

Young signed as a free agent with the Boston Red Sox on February 3, 1999, and played one season with the team in 2000. In an 18-game major league career, he posted a 6.23 ERA with 13 strikeouts in 13 innings pitched without a decision or save.

He was a member of the US Baseball Team that won a gold medal at the 2000 Summer Olympics in Sydney. In December 2000 he was purchased by the Hiroshima Toyo Carp of Japan's Central League.

He continued to play in the minor leagues until 2004, playing for 12 different minor league teams between 1996 and 2004. He pitched for Triple-A Pawtucket, Syracuse, Colorado, Memphis and Buffalo.

In 2004, Young played for the Sinon Bulls of the Chinese Professional Baseball League.

References

External links

U.S. Baseball Team
Pelota Binaria (Venezuelan Winter League)

1973 births
Living people
Alabama Crimson Tide baseball players
American expatriate baseball players in Canada
American expatriate baseball players in Japan
Baseball players at the 2000 Summer Olympics
Baseball players from Mississippi
Boston Red Sox players
Buffalo Bisons (minor league) players
Cape Fear Crocs players
Colorado Springs Sky Sox players
Harrisburg Senators players
Hiroshima Toyo Carp players
Major League Baseball pitchers
Memphis Redbirds players
Medalists at the 2000 Summer Olympics
Montreal Expos players
Navegantes del Magallanes players
American expatriate baseball players in Venezuela
Nippon Professional Baseball pitchers
Olympic gold medalists for the United States in baseball
Ottawa Lynx players
Pawtucket Red Sox players
Sportspeople from Gulfport, Mississippi
Syracuse SkyChiefs players
Trenton Thunder players
Vermont Expos players
West Palm Beach Expos players